Alejandro Andrade Rivera (born 16 August 2001) is a Mexican professional footballer who plays as a midfielder for Liga MX club Necaxa.

Career statistics

Club

References

External links
 
 
 

Living people
2001 births
Association football midfielders
Atlético Morelia players
Club Necaxa footballers
Liga MX players
Mexico under-20 international footballers
Footballers from Aguascalientes
Mexican footballers
People from Aguascalientes City